Antonio Tallura is an Italian actor and writer, known to the general public for his numerous appearances in the theater, but also for investments in television hit series.

Biography 
Antonio Tallura was born in Locri (RC) Italy on 11 February 1958, to Calabrian parents, where he spent his teenage years assiduously attending an open-air cinema in the country, where his passion for acting was inspired by interpreting certain characters the film, in addition to study and graduate from achieving his artistic maturity, spends his free time in the magnificent Locri rich in archaeological finds, shrines and temples, often going at the archaeological site of the Roman Greek Theatre of Locri where thanks to 'meeting with teachers and local designers began to cultivate his great passion for acting and theater.
In 1978 decides to go to Rome, and began attending the Academy of Dramatic Arts
PETER SHAROOFF, in 1981 he graduated.

He is currently a teacher of diction and phonetics.

Play in Italian National Football Actors  for charity meetings and serves on the board of directors.

Theatre 
2015-2016 Uno Sguardo dal Ponte di A. Miller-		        Regia di E. M. Lamanna
2014-2015 Pierino e il Lupo Acc. Reale della Calabria  
2012 -2013 Il TARTUFO di Moliere 			        Regia di G. Anfuso  
2010-2011 L’Affarista Mercadet di Balzac 		        Regia A. Calenda 
2009-2010 Krooner  (N. Arigliano) 			        Regia F. Abbondati 
1988-2000 Riccardo III di William Shakespeare 	        Regia A. Calenda
1996-1997 Edipo a Colono  				        Regia di A.Calenda 
1992-1993 Madre Courage 				        Regia di A. Calenda 
1995-1996 Romeo e Giulietta 				        Regia di Giuseppe Patroni GRIFFI  
1994-1995 Sabato Domenica e Lunedi di E. de Filippo   	        Regia di Giuseppe Patroni GRIFFI
1984 1985 Cosi E’ se vi Pare di L. Pirandello 		        Regia di F. Zeffirelli
1985-1986 Il DIAVOLO e il Buon DIO 			        Regia G. Lavia 
1987 	      FAUST                  				Regia di G, SBRAGIA 
1986-1987 GIULIO CESARE  				        Regia di K. Zanussi 
1982-1983 ARTURO UI          				        Regia di G. SEPE 
1981-1982 Cosi E’ Se Vi Pare 				        Regia di G. SEPE 
1982	      Intorno a Garibaldi 				Regia di M. Perlini 
1988	      Barry Lindon          				Regia di A. Aglioti 
1987-1988 Invito in Scena con Delitto 			        Regia di M.Cinque 
1989-1990 La Lupa               				Regia di P. de Cristofaro 
1991	     MEDEA                				Regia di P. de Cristofaro 
1991-1992 La Ciociara          				        Regia di A. Reggiani 
1990-1991 La Bisbetica Domata 			                Regia di A. Zucchi 
1992 	      W Campanile        				Regia di A. Venturi 
1990 	     Interrogatorio a Maria 			        Regia di G. Dolcini 
1993 	     Falcone e Borsellino 				Regia di G. Torlonia 
1988 	    La Locandiera       				Regia di S. Cardone  
1993 	    I Guardiani di Porci  				Regia Marsili - Corbucci

Television 
Questo è il mio Paese        				( RAI 1)
Provaci ancora Prof            				( RAI 1)
Squadra Antimafia             				( CANALE 5)
REX                                        		( RAI 1)
LA LADRA                             			( RAI 1)
LA SQUADRA                       			( RAI 3)
Niente di Personale            				( Crimini RAI 2)
INCANTESIMO 2001-2008 				        ( RAI1)
I Misteri di villa Flamini      			( Canale 5)
ORGOGLIO                           			( RAI 1)
VIVERE                        				( Canale 5)
Cento Vetrine              				( Canale 5)
La Nuova Squadra      					( RAI 3)
Un Posto al Sole          				( RAI 3)

Mini Dramas 
Mi Manda Lubrano      					(RAI3)
IL Giudice                    				(RAI 1)
Una Lepre con il Volto da Bambina        		(RAI1)
Noi Lazzaroni           				(RAI 1)

Cinema 
Piacere io sono Piero 					regia E. Carone
Il Mistero della Donna del Treno (opera prima in 3 d) 	Regia di F. Femia
Garofalo 						Regia di Pappi CORSICATO
L’Ultimo RE 						regia di Aurelio Grimaldi
San Francesco di Paola 					regia di Fabio Marra
Bonjour Michel 					        regia Arcangelo Bonaccorso
Le Cinque Rose di Jennifer 				regia di Tomaso Schermann
Quelli Della Speciale 					regia di Bruno Corbucci

Radio 
TITANIC                					(Radio 2)
J. F. KENNEDY      					(Radio 2)

Books 
“ NACA MIA “ Edition Il Portichetto di Cuneo(Poems in the vernacular Calabrese won several awards)
“ ‘NU CANTU “ Ed. Laruffa di Reggio Cal. (Short stories and monologues for theater staged in different years)

References 

 Uno sguardo dal ponte
 Incantesimo
 Book Nu Cuntu

External links 
 

1958 births
Living people
20th-century Italian male actors
21st-century Italian male actors
Italian male writers
People from Locri
People of Calabrian descent